Nollywood TV is the first French-speaking television channel dedicated to Nigerian cinema, also called Nollywood. The films are entirely full dubbed in French and not simply subtitled.

History
Created by Thema in 2012, Nollywood TV has 750 hours of cinematographic programs, originating from the South African television channel Africa Magic (M-Net/MultiChoice group).

Distribution
The channel is distributed within the Le Bouquet Africain at Free since 5 October 2012, via SFR TV since 12 December 2012, Orange since 4 April 2013, Numericable since 10 June 2013, CanalSat Afrique since 2 April 2013 and CanalSat France since 13 January 2015.

References

External links
 

Television stations in France
French-language television stations
Television channels and stations established in 2012
2012 establishments in France
Mass media in Paris
Canal+